Andrew Reed may refer to:

Sports
Andrew Reed (baseball), American baseball third baseman
Andrew Joseph Reed or A. J. Reed (born 1993), American baseball first baseman
Andrew Reed (rower), American rower
Andy Reed (rugby union) (born 1969), former Cornish rugby union player who played for Scotland

Others
Andrew Reed (minister) (1787–1862), British Congregational minister and philanthropist
Andrew Reed (police officer) (1837–1914), inspector in the Irish policeforce
Andy Reed (politician) (born 1964), former British MP

See also
Andrew F. Read, biologist
Andy Reid (disambiguation)